The XIV Turkmen President’s Cup took place in Ashgabat beginning February 21, 2008

Group stage

Group A

Group B

Group C

Elimination round

Semi-final

3rd place game

Final

 HTTU kept hold of the Turkmenistan President’s Cup after coming from a goal down to defeat Turkmen league champions 2–1 in the final of the ten-team tournament.
AFC President’s Cup qualifiers Ashgabat took the lead in the 13th minute through Arif Mirzoev but for the second successive final HTTU would come from behind to take the trophy.
The Students, who twice fought back to defeat Aşgabat 3-2 and win the 2007 Turkmenistan President’s Cup, got on level terms when Perkhat Podarov equalised before Berdi Şamyradow scored three minutes into the second-half with the goal that gave HTTU the trophy and the US$20,000 winners’ cheque.

2008
President's Cup